2012 Vegalta Sendai season.

Competitions

J.League

League table

Matches

J.League Cup

Quarter-finals

Emperor's Cup

References

Vegalta Sendai
Vegalta Sendai seasons